The Pingtung Art Museum is an art museum in Pingtung City, Pingtung County, Taiwan.

History
The construction of the building which houses the museum was completed in October 1953 and housed the Pingtung City Government. In July 2005, the city government moved to a new site and the old building was left vacant. In 2006, the city government signed an agreement with Pingtung County Government to lend the building to the county government and convert it into a museum. The building was then turned into the Pingtung Art Museum with funds from the Council for Cultural Affairs. On 16 January 2012, the lease agreement ended and the museum was handed over back to the city government. On 12 January 2013, the museum was officially opened to the public.

Transportation
The museum is accessible within walking distance north from Pingtung Station of the Taiwan Railways.

See also
 List of museums in Taiwan

References

External links

  

2013 establishments in Taiwan
Art museums and galleries in Taiwan
Art museums established in 2013
Museums in Pingtung County